Agamyxis is a genus of thorny catfishes.

Species 
There are currently two recognized species in this genus:
 Agamyxis albomaculatus (W. K. H. Peters, 1877) (Spiny cat-fish)
 Agamyxis pectinifrons (Cope, 1870) (Spotted Raphael catfish, Spotted doradid, Whitebarred catfish)

Distribution
This genus is found in tropical South America.

Description
Both species reach about 15 centimetres (6 in) SL. These species both appear very similar; A. albomaculatus might be slimmer, have more spots and a different pattern on its caudal fin.

Ecology
These catfish are able to make sounds by grinding their pectoral fin bones against their shoulder bones. They can live for 17 years.

In the aquarium
Both species in this genus are popular in the aquarium trade.

See also
List of freshwater aquarium fish species

References

Doradidae
Fish of South America
Fish of the Amazon basin
Catfish genera
Taxa named by Edward Drinker Cope
Freshwater fish genera